Wesley Georges Jobello (born 23 January 1994) is a professional footballer who plays as a midfielder for Liga I side FC Argeș Pitești. Born in metropolitan France, he represents Martinique at international level.

Club career
Jobello was born in Gennevilliers, and made his professional debut on 20 May 2012 in a league match against Sochaux, appearing as a substitute.

On 14 June 2019, Jobello signed a three year contract with EFL League One side Coventry City for an undisclosed fee. On 13 January 2022, Jobello was released from Coventry City after his contract was terminated by mutual consent.

On 29 January 2022, Jobello signed with Boulogne in the Championnat National. He joined Romanian club UTA Arad in July 2022.

International career
Jobello is formerly a France youth international, having represented his nation at under-18 level, but switched and currently represents the Martinique national football team at senior level. In May 2019, Jobello was named to Martinique's 40-man provisional squad for the 2019 CONCACAF Gold Cup.

Career statistics

Club

International statistics

International goals
Scores and results list Martinique's goal tally first.

References

External links
 
 
 
 

Living people
1994 births
People from Gennevilliers
Footballers from Hauts-de-Seine
French people of Martiniquais descent
French footballers
France youth international footballers
Martiniquais footballers
Martinique international footballers
Association football midfielders
ES Viry-Châtillon players
Olympique de Marseille players
Clermont Foot players
Gazélec Ajaccio players
Coventry City F.C. players
US Boulogne players
FC UTA Arad players
FC Argeș Pitești players
Ligue 1 players
Ligue 2 players
Liga I players
Championnat National players
Championnat National 3 players
English Football League players
French expatriate footballers
Martiniquais expatriate footballers
Expatriate footballers in England
French expatriate sportspeople in England
Martiniquais expatriate sportspeople in England
Expatriate footballers in Romania
French expatriate sportspeople in Romania
Martiniquais expatriate sportspeople in Romania